Goran Stojiljković (born November 13, 1979) is a Montenegrin marathon runner. He set both a national record and a personal best time of 2:20:11 at the 2008 Rotterdam Marathon in the Netherlands.

Stojiljković represented Montenegro at the 2008 Summer Olympics in Beijing, where he competed for the men's marathon. He successfully finished the race in sixty-second place by ten seconds behind Peru's Constantino León, with a time of 2:28:14.  His former coaches are Tomislav Stefanović and Aleksandar Petrović.

References

External links

NBC 2008 Olympics profile

1979 births
Living people
Montenegrin male marathon runners
Montenegrin male long-distance runners
Olympic athletes of Montenegro
Athletes (track and field) at the 2008 Summer Olympics